Trontano is a comune (municipality) in the Province of Verbano-Cusio-Ossola in the Italian Piedmont region, located about  northeast of Turin and about  northwest of Verbania.

Trontano borders the following municipalities: Beura-Cardezza, Cossogno, Domodossola, Druogno, Malesco, Masera, Premosello-Chiovenda, Santa Maria Maggiore.

Demographic evolution

References

Cities and towns in Piedmont